Northern Ireland is divided into 18 parliamentary constituencies: 4 borough constituencies in Belfast and 14 county constituencies elsewhere. Section 33 of the Northern Ireland Act 1998 provides that the constituencies for the Northern Ireland Assembly are the same as the constituencies that are used for the United Kingdom Parliament. Parliamentary constituencies are not used for local government, which is instead carried out by 11 district councils; these often have different boundaries.

Constituencies
Each constituency returns one Member of Parliament (MP) to the House of Commons at Westminster and five Members of the Legislative Assembly (MLAs) to the devolved Northern Ireland Assembly at Stormont. Six MLAs were returned per constituency until the Assembly Members (Reduction of Numbers) Act (Northern Ireland) 2016 reduced the number to five, effective from the 2017 Assembly election.
 Belfast East
 Belfast North
 Belfast South
 Belfast West
 East Antrim
 East Londonderry
 Fermanagh & South Tyrone
 Foyle
 Lagan Valley
 Mid Ulster
 Newry & Armagh
 North Antrim
 North Down
 South Antrim
 South Down
 Strangford
 Upper Bann
 West Tyrone

2019 general election

Data from the BBC Election Website. For full official results see the Electoral Office of Northern Ireland.

Historical representation by party
Where a cell is marked → (with a different colour of frame to the preceding cell) it indicates that the previous MP continued to sit under a new party affiliation. Changes are dated in the header row: either a general election (four-figure year, bold, link) or by-election or change in affiliation (two-figure year, italic, link or details appear on hover).

1801 to 1832 (22 MPs)

Antrim

Londonderry 

* Sir George Hill, 2nd Baronet, was elected to sit as MP for both Coleraine and Londonderry City in the 1806 general election and chose to continue to sit for Londonderry City, hence the 1807 by-election, in which Walter Jones was restored to his seat.

Tyrone

* At both the 1802 and 1806 elections, George Knox was returned for both Dungannon and Dublin University and chose to sit for the university seat.

Armagh

* Charles Brownlow was initially elected as a Tory but at some point changed his affiliation to sit with the Whigs.

Down

* The Parliaments of England by Henry Stooks Smith suggests that after the 1806 election there was a petition, which led to Edward Southwell Ruthven (Whig) being unseated and John Wilson Croker (Tory) being declared duly elected. Parliamentary Election Results in Ireland, 1801–1922, edited by BM Walker, does not make any reference to such a petition.

Fermanagh

1832 to 1885 (29 MPs)

Antrim

Londonderry 

*unseated on petition

Tyrone

Armagh

Down

Fermanagh

1885 to 1918 (25 MPs)

Antrim

Armagh

Belfast

Down

Fermanagh

Londonderry

Tyrone

1918 to 1922 (30 MPs)

1922 to 1950 (13 MPs)

1950 to 1983 (12 MPs)
Periodic boundary reviews commenced in 1947. The elections at which these were implemented are tagged with diamond suit characters, ♦.

The 1st Periodic Review boundary map can be viewed on the ARK elections website. Changes in the 2nd review were relatively minor.

Notes:
 The constituency was won by Philip Clarke of Sinn Féin, but he was unseated on petition on the basis that his criminal conviction (for Irish Republican Army activity) made him ineligible. Instead, the seat was awarded to the Ulster Unionist Party (UUP) candidate.
 The seat was originally won by Tom Mitchell of Sinn Féin, but Mitchell was subsequently unseated upon petition, on the grounds that his terrorist convictions made him ineligible to sit in Parliament. The seat was awarded to Charles Beattie of the UUP. However, Beattie in turn was also found ineligible to sit due to holding an office of profit under the crown, triggering a further by-election.
 Original winner of the 1950 election in that seat, James Godfrey MacManaway (UUP), disqualified due to being a clergyman. Teevan won the subsequent by-election

1983 to present (17, then 18 MPs)
3rd and 4th Review boundary maps can be viewed on the ARK elections website: 1983, 1997.

1Paisley Jr was suspended from the DUP between July and November 2018.

Seats by political alignment (1983–present)

Proposed boundary changes 
See 2023 Periodic Review of Westminster constituencies for further details.

Following the abandonment of the Sixth Periodic Review (the 2018 review), the Boundary Commission for Northern Ireland formally launched the 2023 Review on 5 January 2021. In accordance with the provisions of the Parliamentary Constituencies Act 2020, the number of constituencies allocated to Northern Ireland is unchanged, at 18. Initial proposals were published on 20 October 2021 and, following two periods of public consultation, revised proposals were published on 17 November 2022. Final proposals will be published by 1 July 2023.

Under the revised proposals, the following constituencies for Northern Ireland would come into effect at the next general election:

See also
Politics of Northern Ireland

External links
 List of changes to constituency boundaries: section 6 of Parliamentary constituency boundaries: the Fifth Periodical Review House of Commons Library

References

Northern Ireland
 
Parliamentary constituencies